Dutrion is a brand name chlorine tablet for use in cleaning of meats and treatment of drinking water. The primary sanitizing compound is ClO2.

References

Water treatment
Chlorine oxides